Foxall is a surname. Notable people with the surname include:

Damian Foxall (born 1969), Irish sailor
Edgar Foxall (1900–1990), English poet
Frank Foxall (born 1884), English footballer
Fred Foxall (1898–1926), English footballer
Henry Foxall (1758–1823), American politician, industrialist and preacher
Stan Foxall (1914–1991), English footballer